Sabina Chantouria, Olga Sabina Tchantouria Vamling, (born July 12, 1991, in Lund), is a Swedish-Georgian singer and songwriter.

Biography
Sabina participated in the Georgian national competition final for the Eurovision Song Contest in 2017 Georgia in the Eurovision Song Contest 2017 with her song "Stranger", which she released after the national final. Stranger was recorded by Amir Aly in Malmö. In 2011 Sabina was chosen to participate in the talentshow World Champhionship of Performing Arts in Hollywood, with a song of her own. Sabina has also made TV appearances and guested talkshows in Georgia and worked with big names in both Sweden and Georgia. Sabina has performed at festivals and given concert in Sweden, Denmark, Georgia and the US. In 2012, Sabina won the musiccompetition Publikens favorit by Malmöfestivalen in Sweden.

In 2013, Sabina released her debut maxi single A Confession. Thereafter Spiderweb (2014) and, in 2016, the widely acclaimed single Cry for me". The song Cry for me was recorded by the American producer Kevin Jarvis (who has worked with Iggy Pop, Leonard Cohen, Elvis Costello, Ben Vaughn etc. The actor Ryan Francis (teenage Peter Pan in the film Hook by Steven Spielberg), acted together with Sabina in her music videos Spiderweb and Cry for me.

 Discography 

 Singles 
2013: "A Confession (maxi single)"
2014: "Spiderweb"
2016: "Cry for me"
2017: "Stranger"

Music videos
2014: "Spiderweb" 
2016: "Cry for me" 
2017: "Stranger''"

References

External links 
 Officiell webbplats

1991 births
Swedish singer-songwriters
Living people
21st-century Swedish singers